The Castel Volturno massacre (Italian: Strage di Castel Volturno or Strage di San Gennaro) is the name given by the Italian press to a mass shooting perpetrated by the Casalesi clan in which seven people were killed on 18 September 2008. The massacre outside the Ob Ob Exotic Fashion tailor shop on the Via Domitiana was widely characterized as part of a growing conflict between the native Camorra and the immigrant African drug gangs. Murdered were Antonio Celiento, the owner of an arcade next to Baia Verde, and six African immigrants: Samuel Kwaku, 26 (Togo); Alaj Ababa (Togo); Francis Antwi, 31  (Ghana); Eric Affum Yeboah, 25 (Ghana); Alex  Geemes,  28 (Liberia) and Cristopher Adams, 28 (Liberia). Joseph Ayimbora (Ghana), 34, survived by feigning death; he later helped identify the killers. None of the African victims were involved in criminal activities and were chosen at random.

The murders sparked violent protests from Castel Volturno's immigrant community the following day, which culminated in the signing of measures launched by the Ministry of Interior and the Ministry of Defense on combating organized crime and illegal immigration to Caserta.

The Africans' killers were identified as Alfonso Cesarano, Alessandro Cirillo and Oreste Spagnuolo. A further three people, Francesco Cirillo, Emilio Di Caterino and Giovanni Letizia, have been suspected of involvement in the murders, which were ordered by Giuseppe Setola, affiliated with the Casalesi clan.

Arrests
On 22 September 2008, the first arrest was made in connection with the massacre. Alfonso Cesarano, a Casalesi triggerman, was found in his parents' home in Baia Verde, where he was under house arrest on drug charges next to the arcade where the first victim, Celiento, had been killed.

The Italian government deployed 400 troops into the area. A huge anti-Camorra operation conducted in that same month by the Carabinieri dealt a devastating blow on the Casalesi clan, resulting in the arrests of 107 people including prominent members of the association, some of whom were on the list of 30 most wanted fugitives in Italy. Among those arrested were Alessandro Cirillo and  Oreste Spagnuolo, the main co-ordinators of the attack. On January 14, 2009, Setola was finally arrested in Mignano Monte Lungo after a week on the run. During this period, he was included in the list of 30 most dangerous fugitives in Italy and was sentenced to life imprisonment in absentia after being convicted on charges of ordering several killings and massacres, including that at Castel Volturno.

Convictions
In 2011, the court in Santa Maria Capua Vetere (Caserta) sentenced Giuseppe Setola, Davide Granato, Alessandro Cirillo, Giovanni Letizia to life imprisonment and Antonio Alluce to 23 years. The Court recognized the existence of aggravating circumstances such as racial hatred and terrorist purposes.

References

External links 

2008 mass shootings in Europe
2008 murders in Italy
2010s trials
21st century in Campania
21st-century mass murder in Europe
Casalesi clan
Crime in Campania
Deaths by firearm in Italy
History of the Camorra in Italy
Mass murder in 2008
Mass shootings in Italy
Massacres in 2008
Massacres in Italy
Murder trials
Organized crime events in Italy
People murdered by the Camorra
September 2008 crimes
September 2008 events in Europe
Trials in Italy
Violent non-state actor incidents in Italy